In Greek mythology, Euphemus  (Eὔphēmos,  "reputable") was counted among the Calydonian hunters and the Argonauts, and was connected with the legend of the foundation of Cyrene.

Family 
Euphemus was a son of Poseidon, granted by his father the power to walk on water. His mother is variously named: (1) Europe, daughter of the giant Tityos; (2) Doris (Oris), (3) Mecionice, daughter of either Eurotas or Orion or (4) lastly, Macionassa. In some accounts he is said to have been married to Laonome, sister of Heracles.

Mythology 
Euphemus birthplace is given as "the banks of the Cephissus" by Pindar or Hyria in Boeotia by the Megalai Ehoiai, but his later residence was Taenarum in Laconia. Euphemus joined the voyage of the Argonauts, and served the crew as helmsman. He let a dove fly between the Symplegades to see if the ship would be able to pass as well. By a Lemnian woman (Malicha, Malache, or Lamache) he became the father of Leucophanes.

Euphemus was mythologically linked to the Greek colonization of Libya and foundation of Cyrene. In Pindar's Pythian Ode 4, the myth of him as the ancestor of the colonizers is recounted in the form of a prophecy by Medea, and runs as follows. When the Argonauts stop by the lake Tritonis in Libya, they encounter Eurypylus, a son of Poseidon, who offers them a clod of earth as a sign of hospitality. Euphemus takes the clod with instructions to throw it on the ground beside the entrance to the Underworld at Taenarum by which his descendants in the fourth generation would then rule over Libya. The clod is accidentally washed overboard and carried to the island Thera, and Libya is colonized from that island by Battus of Thera, an alleged distant descendant of Euphemus (by 17 generations), who founds Cyrene. 

The Argonautica by Apollonius Rhodius appears to follow a different version of the same myth: in the poem, when the Argonauts arrive near Lake Tritonis, Euphemus accepts the clod of earth from Triton who first introduces himself as Eurypylus but later reveals his true divine identity. Later, Euphemus has a dream of the clod producing drops of milk and then changing into a woman; in his dream, he has sex with the woman, and at the same time cries over her as if she were nursed by him; she then tells him that she is a daughter of Triton and Libya and the nurse of future children of Euphemus, and instructs him to entrust her to the care of the Nereids, promising that she would return in the future to provide a home for Euphemus' children. Euphemus consults Jason about this dream and, following his advice, throws the clod in the sea, whereupon it transforms into the island Calliste (Thera). The island is later colonized by the descendants of Euphemus who had previously been expelled from Lemnos and failed to find refuge in Sparta.

Euphemus was portrayed on the chest of Cypselus as the winner of the chariot race at the funeral games of Pelias.

In popular culture
In the 1963 motion picture Jason and the Argonauts Euphemus is portrayed by British actor/stuntman Doug Robinson. The film relegates him to being only a minor character recognized as being a champion swimmer. In contrast to his mythology, Euphemus is killed by the film's villain Acastus who betrayed the Argonauts.

Notes

References 

 Apollonius Rhodius, Argonautica translated by Robert Cooper Seaton (1853-1915), R. C. Loeb Classical Library Volume 001. London, William Heinemann Ltd, 1912. Online version at the Topos Text Project.
 Apollonius Rhodius, Argonautica. George W. Mooney. London. Longmans, Green. 1912. Greek text available at the Perseus Digital Library.
 Gaius Julius Hyginus, Fabulae from The Myths of Hyginus translated and edited by Mary Grant. University of Kansas Publications in Humanistic Studies. Online version at the Topos Text Project.
 Herodotus, The Histories with an English translation by A. D. Godley. Cambridge. Harvard University Press. 1920. Online version at the Topos Text Project. Greek text available at Perseus Digital Library.
 John Tzetzes, Book of Histories, Book II-IV translated by Gary Berkowitz from the original Greek of T. Kiessling's edition of 1826.  Online version at theio.com
 Pausanias, Description of Greece with an English Translation by W.H.S. Jones, Litt.D., and H.A. Ormerod, M.A., in 4 Volumes. Cambridge, MA, Harvard University Press; London, William Heinemann Ltd. 1918. Online version at the Perseus Digital Library
 Pausanias, Graeciae Descriptio. 3 vols. Leipzig, Teubner. 1903.  Greek text available at the Perseus Digital Library.
 Pindar, Odes translated by Diane Arnson Svarlien. 1990. Online version at the Perseus Digital Library.
 Pindar, The Odes of Pindar including the Principal Fragments with an Introduction and an English Translation by Sir John Sandys, Litt.D., FBA. Cambridge, MA., Harvard University Press; London, William Heinemann Ltd. 1937. Greek text available at the Perseus Digital Library.
 Gaius Valerius Flaccus, Argonautica translated by Mozley, J H. Loeb Classical Library Volume 286. Cambridge, MA, Harvard University Press; London, William Heinemann Ltd. 1928. Online version at theio.com.
 Gaius Valerius Flaccus, Argonauticon. Otto Kramer. Leipzig. Teubner. 1913. Latin text available at the Perseus Digital Library.
 The Orphic Argonautica, translated by Jason Colavito. © Copyright 2011. Online version at the Topos Text Project.

Bibliography
 .

Argonauts
Children of Poseidon
Demigods in classical mythology
Characters in the Argonautica
Boeotian characters in Greek mythology